The 2012–13 South Carolina Gamecocks men's basketball team represent the University of South Carolina in the 2012–13 college basketball season. The team's head coach is Frank Martin, who is in his first season at South Carolina. The team plays their home games at the Colonial Life Arena in Columbia, South Carolina as a member of the Southeastern Conference.

Previous season
The Gamecocks posted a record of 10–21 (2-14 SEC) in the 2011–12 season and finished twelfth in the SEC standings. The Gamecocks at the conclusion of the season terminated head coach Darrin Horn after his fourth season as coach.  In his place the Gamecocks hired Frank Martin, who had coached the previous five seasons at Kansas State.  While at Kansas State, Martin guided the Wildcats to four NCAA Tournament berths including an Elite Eight appearance in 2010.

Roster

Depth chart

Schedule

|-
!colspan=12| Exhibition

|-
!colspan=12| Non-Conference Regular Season

|-
!colspan=12| SEC Regular Season

|-
!colspan=12| 2013 SEC tournament

|-
| colspan="12" | *Non-Conference Game. Rankings from AP poll. All times are in Eastern Time.
|}

References

South Carolina
South Carolina Gamecocks men's basketball seasons
Game
Game